St Paul's Church is a Church of England church in Easton, Somerset, England. The church, which was designed by Richard Carver and built in 1843, has been a Grade II listed building since 1987.

History
St Paul's was erected in 1843 as a chapel of ease in the parish of St Cuthbert Out through the efforts of the vicar, Rev. H. W. Barnard. The church was consecrated by the Bishop of Salisbury, Rev. Edward Denison, on 4 February 1844, with assistance from the Archdeacon of Bath, Rev. William Brymer, the Canon of Salisbury, Rev. W. Hamilton, and the Chancellor of the Diocese of Bath and Wells, Rev. W. Towry Law.

The church's centenary was celebrated in February 1944 with a visit by the Bishop of Salisbury, Rev. Neville Lovett. Addresses were given by the Bishop and Rev. J. W. C. Wand, while a talk on the church's history was given by Rev. P. S. Thomas.

Architecture
St Paul's is built of coursed and squared rubble, with a slate roof and bellcote, in a Neo-Norman style. The inside is made up of a two-bay nave, transepts and chancel with a vestry.

References

Churches in Somerset
Grade II listed churches in Somerset
Church of England church buildings in Somerset
Churches completed in 1843
Religious organizations established in 1844
Gothic Revival church buildings in England